Springdale is an unincorporated community in Leavenworth County, Kansas, United States.

History
Springdale was platted in 1860. A post office was established at Springdale in 1860, and remained in operation until it was discontinued in 1907.

References

Further reading

External links
 Leavenworth County maps: Current, Historic, KDOT

Unincorporated communities in Leavenworth County, Kansas
Unincorporated communities in Kansas